Radenski Vrh is a settlement in the Municipality of Radenci in northeastern Slovenia.

References

External links
Radenski Vrh on Geopedia

Populated places in the Municipality of Radenci